The Plattenberg is a mountain of the Lepontine Alps, located on the border between the Swiss cantons of Ticino and Graubünden. It lies approximately halfway between the lakes of Luzzone and Zervreila.

References

External links
 Plattenberg on Hikr

Mountains of the Alps
Alpine three-thousanders
Mountains of Switzerland
Mountains of Graubünden
Mountains of Ticino
Graubünden–Ticino border
Lepontine Alps